Walter de Beauchamp may refer to:

 Walter de Beauchamp (nobleman) (died  1130), of Elmley, hereditary  Sheriff of Worcestershire 1114–1130
 Walter de Beauchamp (Steward to Edward I), (d.1306) of Beauchamp's Courty, Alcester;
 Walter de Beauchamp (justice) ( 1192–1236), of Elmley, hereditary  Sheriff of Worcestershire 1215–1236

See also
 Sir Walter Beauchamp ( 1380–1430), MP for Wiltshire 1416 and Speaker of the House of Commons 1416
 Walter Beauchamp (cricketer) (1887–1976), South African cricketer